The 2007 Mexico City 400k was a Grand-Am Rolex Sports Car Series race held on March 3, 2007. The race was won by Alex Gurney and Jon Fogarty, driving the No. 99 GAINSCO Auto Insurance Pontiac Riley, campaigned by GAINSCO/Bob Stallings Racing.

Results

DP: Daytona Prototype
GT: Grand Touring

References

Mexico City 400k